Kirsten Nelson (born October 3, 1970) is an American actress and director best known for her role as police chief Karen Vick on the TV series Psych.

Early life and education 
Kirsten Nelson was born in Enid, Oklahoma and raised in Chicago. Nelson grew up playing the piano and singing, and has said "I wanted to be a concert pianist at Carnegie Hall, that is what I wanted to do from really early on." Nelson graduated from Northwestern University.

Career 
Nelson was a founding member of Chicago's Roadworks Theatre Ensemble before moving to Los Angeles in 1995.

She is known for her starring role as Police Chief Karen Vick on Psych.

Nelson's career includes roles in Buffy the Vampire Slayer (as Lorraine), The O'Keefes (as Ellie O'Keefe), Baby's Day Out, The Fugitive, Frasier, Ally McBeal, The West Wing, Just Shoot Me! and Boy Meets World. Most recently, she played Danielle Bishop on K.C. Undercover.

Personal life 
Nelson is an ELCA Lutheran. She is married and has two children.

Filmography

Film

Television

References

External links 

Actresses from Chicago
Northwestern University alumni
Living people
Actresses from Oklahoma
1970 births
Actors from Enid, Oklahoma
20th-century American actresses
21st-century American actresses
Evangelical Lutheran Church in America Christians
Christians from Illinois
American television actresses